Gu Li (Chinese: 古力; Pinyin: Gǔ Lì; born February 3, 1983) is a Chinese professional Go player.

Biography 
Gu Li is a Chinese go player. He became a pro in 1995 when he was only 12.  In 2006, he won the 10th LG Cup and became the youngest Chinese player to ever win a major international title; as a result, he was also promoted to 9 dan. In March 2007, he defeated Chang Hao 2-0 to win the Chunlan Cup. In mid-2007, Gu Li experienced a playing slump, even losing many matches against lower dan players. However, he soon came back stronger than ever, winning many major titles both domestic and international, including the 2007 Changqi Cup and the 2008 Fujitsu Cup; the greatest factors in this turnaround was his improvement in the endgame, and territory skills, which many people had previously considered his biggest weaknesses.  In 2009 Gu defeated Lee Sedol to win the 13th LG Cup.

In July 2010, Gu Li became the "Meijin of Meijins" by defeating Lee Changho and Iyama Yuta in a special tournament which pitted the domestic title-holders from China, Korea and Japan against each other.

In October 2010, Gu Li defeated Han Sanghoon and Lee Sedol in the round of sixteen and quarter-finals respectively to reach the semi-finals of the 15th Samsung Cup, whilst the defending Champion Kong Jie was knocked out by Kim Jiseok. Gu won the 2010 Samsung Cup, defeating Heo Youngho of Korea, and moves on towards the 2012 Ing Cup to become the second player to win all major international titles (Although Lee Chang-ho is the first and so far only person to win all titles, including the defunct World Oza and Zhonghuan Cup, as well as the Tong Yang Cup).

In 2014, Gu Li was defeated in a jubango against Lee Sedol (+2-6). The games took place on each last Sunday of the month.

Style 
His given name Li, literally meaning strength, is also a Go term roughly meaning the ability of reading. Li also encompasses the meaning of the ability to discover strong moves and the ability to fight. Gu has a nickname "Gu Da Li". Da literally means large, big or huge. This refers to Gu's incredible ability at playing really strong moves that require sharp instinct as well as immaculate reading. One of his main weaknesses is his inaccurate endgame.

Promotion record

Career record 

Note: 2012 and 2013 also include one game with no result.

Titles and runners-up
 
Ranks #2 in total number of titles in China and #5 in total number of international titles.

Head-to-head record vs selected players

Players who have won international Go titles in bold.

 Lee Sedol 24:24 +1 no result
 Kong Jie 26:18
 Hu Yaoyu 24:12
 Liu Xing 21:13
 Zhou Ruiyang 24:9
 Chang Hao 20:11
 Chen Yaoye 10:21 +1 no result
 Luo Xihe 16:12
 Qiu Jun 18:9
 Zhou Heyang 15:12
 Ding Wei 17:8
 Xie He 14:11
 Shi Yue 7:17
 Gu Lingyi 13:10
 Piao Wenyao 13:8
 Wang Xi 12:9
 Choi Cheolhan 12:8
 Li Zhe 12:7
 Peng Quan 11:7
 Lee Changho 8:9
 Huang Yizhong 9:6
 Wang Yao 12:3
 Jiang Weijie 7:7
 Wang Lei 11:3

References

External links
 Interview with Gu Li

1982 births
Living people
Chinese Go players
Asian Games medalists in go
Go players at the 2010 Asian Games
Sportspeople from Chongqing
Asian Games silver medalists for China
Medalists at the 2010 Asian Games